The Kozeny–Carman equation (or Carman–Kozeny equation or Kozeny equation) is a relation used in the field of fluid dynamics to calculate the pressure drop of a fluid flowing through a packed bed of solids. It is named after Josef Kozeny and Philip C. Carman. The equation is only valid for creeping flow, i.e. in the slowest limit of laminar flow. The equation was derived by Kozeny (1927) and Carman (1937, 1956) from a starting point of (a) modelling fluid flow in a packed bed as laminar fluid flow in a collection of curving passages/tubes crossing the packed bed and (b) Poiseuille's law describing laminar fluid flow in straight, circular section pipes.

Equation

The equation is given as:

where:
 is the pressure drop;
 is the total height of the bed;
 is the superficial or "empty-tower" velocity;
 is the viscosity of the fluid;
 is the porosity of the bed;
 is the sphericity of the particles in the packed bed;
 is the diameter of the volume equivalent spherical particle.
This equation holds for flow through packed beds with particle Reynolds numbers up to approximately 1.0, after which point frequent shifting of flow channels in the bed causes considerable kinetic energy losses.

This equation is a partial case of the Darcy's law stating that "flow is proportional to the pressure drop and inversely proportional to the fluid viscosity".

Combining these equations gives the final Kozeny equation for absolute (single phase) permeability

 is the porosity of the bed (or core plug) [fraction]
 is average diameter of sand grains [m]
 is absolute (i.e. single phase) permeability [m^2]
 is the [sphericity] of the particles in the packed bed = 1 for spherical particles

The combined proportionality and unity factor  has typically average value of 0.8E6 /1.0135 from measuring many naturally occurring core plug samples, ranging from high to low clay content, but it may reach a value of 3.2E6 /1.0135 for clean sand.   The denominator is included explicitly to remind us that permeability is defined using [atm] as pressure unit while reservoir engineering calculations and reservoir simulations typically use [bar] as pressure unit.

History 
The equation was first proposed by Kozeny (1927) and later modified by Carman (1937, 1956). A similar equation was derived independently by Fair and Hatch in 1933. A comprehensive review of other equations has been published

See also
Fractionating column
Random close pack
Raschig ring
Ergun equation

References

Equations of fluid dynamics
Unit operations
Porous media